Ilko Emilov Pirgov (born 23 May 1986 in Gotse Delchev) is a Bulgarian footballer who plays as a goalkeeper for Lokomotiv Plovdiv. He is the older brother of CSKA 1948's defender Dimitar Pirgov.

Career
Pirgov is an ex-Pirin Blagoevgrad player, where he played from 2002. He moved to CSKA Sofia in 2005.  
As a player of PFC CSKA Sofia he is a Bulgarian Cup winner in 2006. In 2008, he played for six months for Romanian club CS Otopeni. On 10 January 2009 he signed for Cherno More Varna.

During the 2011–12 season Pirgov became the first player in Bulgaria who earned 31 league appearances in 30 rounds. In the first half of the campaign he played in all 15 matches for Cherno More. In December 2011, Pirgov joined Litex Lovech. During a second half of the season he played in all 15 matches of his new club and in the Litex's delayed game of the autumn against Kaliakra Kavarna.

He has developed a reputation as a goalkeeper who is adept in saving penalty kicks, managing the feat on 11 occasions in the A PFG (in two other instances, the penalty takers who faced him did not hit the target) in the period from 2006 to 2020. On 1 July 2020, during the Bulgarian Cup final Pirgov came on as a substitute for Martin Lukov just prior to the commencement of the penalty shootout and was able to save Ali Sowe's kick from the spot, making a decisive contribution towards Lokomotiv Plovdiv's victory. He was subsequently one of a number of Lokomotiv Plovdiv players who developed symptoms and tested positive for COVID-19, though he recovered for the new season. On 29 July 2021, Pirgov saved three out of five penalty kicks against Czech team 1. FC Slovácko in the second leg of a Europa Conference League qualifying phase match, enabling Lokomotiv Plovdiv to prevail in the penalty shootout.

Career statistics

Honours

Club
CSKA Sofia
 Bulgarian League: 2007–08
 Bulgarian Cup: 2005–06

Lokomotiv Plovdiv
Bulgarian Cup (2): 2018–19, 2019–20
Bulgarian Supercup: 2020

References

1986 births
Living people
Bulgarian footballers
OFC Pirin Blagoevgrad players
PFC CSKA Sofia players
CS Otopeni players
PFC Cherno More Varna players
PFC Litex Lovech players
PFC Beroe Stara Zagora players
PFC Lokomotiv Plovdiv players
Association football goalkeepers
Expatriate footballers in Romania
First Professional Football League (Bulgaria) players
Liga I players